Emergency Rations is the second EP by American rapper Mr. Lif, released on June 25, 2002, by Definitive Jux. It was recorded at Bandulero Sound in Berlin, Boston Butta Beats in Boston, and The Pool Room in New York City.

The song "Phantom" was featured on the soundtrack to the 2003 video game Tony Hawk's Underground.

Music and lyrics 
Emergency Rations is a concept album whose premise centers around Mr. Lif's fictional kidnapping presumably by government agents. It showcases his defiant perspective on themes such as civil rights, censorship, and U.S. foreign policy. He also raps about societal ills such as gender socialization, the vapid state of pop culture, and the dehumanizing effects of capitalism. Lif's thoughtful, confrontational lyrics are backed by Akrobatik and El-P's dissonant production, which evokes feelings of paranoia and alienation.

Critical reception 

Emergency Rations received positive reviews from critics. In The A.V. Club, Nathan Rabin highlighted the EP's "solid blast of social consciousness" and wrote that it possessed "a raw, unfinished quality that more than lives up to the urgency of its title". AllMusic's Martin Woodside called Lif "a thoughtful, often incendiary lyricist", while calling Emergency Rations "a provocative, well-crafted album that proves hard to ignore." Robert Christgau from The Village Voice found Mr. Lif "funny" and an "angry guy". According to him, Lif used the EP as both a set up for his subsequent concept album, I Phantom (2002), and as "an excuse to drop random science about the place of hip hop in the military-industrial complex."

Track listing

Personnel 
Credits adapted from liner notes.

 Akrobatik – vocals
 Keith Atkins – engineering
 DJ Hype – cut, production
 Edan – production
 El-P – production, vocals
 Fakts One – cut, production, vocals
 Ray Boy Fernandes – engineering, mixing
 Marc Johnson – engineering
 Dan Ezra Lang – art direction, design, illustrations
 Mr. Lif – primary artist, production
 Nasa – engineering, mixing
 Ghazi Shami – development

Charts

References

External links
 
 

2002 EPs
Mr. Lif albums
Definitive Jux EPs
Albums produced by El-P